Maslozavod is a rural locality (a village) in Novlenskoye Rural Settlement, Vologodsky District, Vologda Oblast, Russia. The population was 11 as of 2002.

Geography 
The distance to Vologda is 76 km, to Novlenskoye is 13 km. Mitropolye is the nearest rural locality.

References 

Rural localities in Vologodsky District